Waverly Plantation may refer to:

Waverly Plantation (Leon County, Florida)
Waverly Plantation (Cunningham, North Carolina), on the National Register of Historic Places

See also
Waverly (house) (disambiguation)